Marie "Mimí" Lisbeth Langer (née, Glas; 31 August 1910 - 22 December 1987) was an Austrian-born Latin American psychoanalyst and human rights activist. She was a cofounder of the Argentine Psychoanalytic Association.

Biography
The daughter of Rudolf Glas and Margarethe Glas, Langer was born in Vienna in 1910. She had a sister, Gusti Eva Glas. Langer attended a private girls' school started by educator Eugenie Schwarzwald. After finishing medical school (mid-1930s), she attended Freud's Psychoanalytic Institute.

At the private school, the Schwarzwald Schule, Langer met Else Pappenheim.  Their lifelong friendship, documented in the 2019 book, Mimi & Els Stationen Eigner Freundschaft Marie Langer – Else Pappenheim – Späte Briefe continued through medical school and their escape from the Nazis.  Pappenheim emigrated to New York City, and like Langer became a well-known psychiatrist and neurologist.

Langer went to work for the International Medical Brigade in Spain during its Civil War. She then emigrated to Buenos Aires and, in 1942, co-founded the Argentine Psychoanalytic Association. Forced into exile in 1974, she moved to Mexico City and was again involved in a private practice while maintaining the responsibilities of professor in clinical psychology at the National Autonomous University of Mexico. She served as co-coordinator of the Internationalist Team of Mental Health Workers, Mexico-Nicaragua, and was also a co-founder of the Organization of Mental Health Workers. She died of cancer in Buenos Aires in 1987.

References

Bibliography

External links

Autobiography (in Spanish)

1910 births
1987 deaths
Psychoanalysts from Vienna
Jewish psychoanalysts
Academic staff of the National Autonomous University of Mexico
Austrian emigrants to Mexico
organization founders
women founders